Ignazio Zuccaro (23 August 1839, Palermo - 28 November 1913, Palermo) was an Italian Roman Catholic priest and bishop. He was ordained a priest on 14 June 1862. Pope Leo XIII appointed him the third bishop of Caltanissetta on 22 June 1896 and he was consecrated on 19 July that year by cardinal Michelangelo Celesia - he remained in that role until 1906, when he was instead made titular archbishop of Archelais, a role he held until his death.

References

1839 births
1913 deaths
Clergy from Palermo
Bishops of Caltanissetta